Signum is Latin for "sign" and may refer to:

Brands and companies
 Integra Signum, a (defunct) Swiss railroad signaling company
 Integra-Signum, a train protection system
 Opel Signum, an Opel car model
 Signum Biosciences, a company based in New Jersey
 Signum (typeface), a 1955 typeface designed by Georg Trump for the Weber Typefoundry

Media
 Signum (magazine), a German literary magazine
 Signum (musical group), a trance music group
 Signum (Nanoha), a character from the Magical Girl Lyrical Nanoha series
 Signum Quartet, a string quartet based in Cologne, Germany
 Signum Records, a classical music record label in the UK

Other uses
 Signum, an alternative name for some Roman Republic army units
 Signum (anatomy), a part of the female Lepidoptera genitalia
 Signum function or sign function in mathematics
 Signum manus, type of signature
 Signum (blockchain)
 Signum University, an online educational institution